The World Peace Gong  is a symbol of world peace.

Function
The first striking of the World Peace Gong was by the President of the Republic of Indonesia, H.E.Mrs Megawati Sukarnoputri, on Bali on 31 December 2002 at 00:00 Central Standard time.

The Gong was struck for the following Events

The Grand Opening "Second Global Summit on Peace Through Tourism" 5–8 February 2003. United Nations Secretary General Geneva, Swiss -
The Grand Opening "PATA	Conference" 13–17 April 2003, Bali – Indonesia
The Grand Opening "Borobudur International Festival" 11–17 June 2003, Central Java - Indonesia

Locations

 Bali, Indonesia: The World Peace Gong Park can  be found on the island of  Bali, Indonesia Desa Budayal Kertalangu Bali. It was the venue for the Miss World Contestants commitment to World Peace, in September 2013,
 Geneva, Switzerland
 New Delhi, India
 Penglai, Shandong, China
 Vientiane, Laos
 Paipa (Colombia)
 Ambon (Indonesia)
 Maputo (Mozambique)
 Kremenchuk (Ukraine)
 Vukovar (Croatia)
 Berat (Albanian)
 Gödöllő (Hungary)

References

Individual gongs